The Entertainment Software Rating Association (ESRA) is a self-regulatory organization that assigns age and content ratings in Iran. The system was established in 2007 by the Iran National Foundation of Computer Games and has the status of a research project.

ESRA Rating marks

Content icons

References

External links 
 

Video game content ratings systems
Video game organizations
Entertainment rating organizations
Media content ratings systems
Media studies
Communications and media organizations